Air-Marshal Sharbat Ali Changezi  (Urdu: شربت على ݘݩگݐڒی; b. 10 March 1932), is a retired three-star air officer in the Pakistan Air Force and a former fighter pilot who led the aerial operations in the Indo-Pakistani War of 1965 and 1971.

In 1955,  Changezi notably refused to meet the Afghan Monarch Zahir Shah, while he was on visit to Pakistan, because of the ill-treatment meted out to the Hazara people in Afghanistan.

Career with the Airforce

1965 War service 
Changezi was involved in a dogfight with Indian warplanes over Lahore district in which he and his wingman shot down Indian planes.

1971 War service 
During the 1971 war, Changezi was the officer commanding of the No. 26 Squadron of the PAF flying F-86 Sabres.

Awards and decorations

See also 

 List of Hazara people
 List of people from Quetta
 General Musa Khan Hazara
 Samad Ali Changezi

References 

Living people
1932 births
Pakistani people of Hazara descent
Hazara military personnel
Pakistan Air Force air marshals
People from Quetta
Pakistan Air Force personnel